Senoculus maronicus is a spider species found in French Guiana.

See also
 List of Senoculidae species

References 

Araneomorphae
Arthropods of South America
Fauna of French Guiana
Spiders described in 1872
Taxa named by Władysław Taczanowski
Spiders of South America